The Sparta Ishmaelite is a newspaper in Sparta, Hancock County, Georgia.  It is the legal organ of Hancock County.  The Ishmaelite was published starting in January 1883.  Its archives are on file at the University of Georgia Libraries.

References

External links
University of Georgia Libraries

Hancock County, Georgia
The Ishmaelite definitely was started before 1883(I don't know how long before) but I cite references going back to 1879.  See my book Ambiguous Lives:  Free Women of Color in Rural Georgia 1789–1879.
Adele Logan Alexander